Joyce Godber (1906-1999) was the county archivist of Bedfordshire and the author of a number of books about the history of that county.

Biography
Joyce Godber was born in 1906.
Christened Amy Joyce Godber. daughter of Isaac and Bessie Godber. She had six brothers William, George, John, Geoffrey, Joseph and Frank.

Godber worked first for Oxford University Press before becoming assistant secretary at the Institute of Historical Research. She subsequently became clerk of the records and county archivist for Bedfordshire, retiring in 1968.

She was editor of the publications of the Bedfordshire Historical Record Society from 1945 to 1977.

Her major work was her History of Bedfordshire 1066–1888 (1969).

Godber died in 1999.

Selected publications
 The Cartulary of Newnham Priory. 2 volumes. Bedford: Bedfordshire Historical Record Society, 1963–1964.
 The Oakley Hunt. Bedford: Bedfordshire Historical Record Society, 1965.
 History of Bedfordshire, 1066–1888. Bedford: Bedfordshire County Council, 1969.
 John Bunyan of Bedfordshire. Bedford: Bedfordshire County Council, 1972.
 The Harpur Trust, 1552-1973. Bedford: Harpur Trust, 1973.
 Friends in Bedfordshire and West Hertfordshire. Willington: Joyce Godber, 1975.
 John Howard the Philanthropist. Bedford: Bedfordshire County Council, 1977.
 The Story of Bedford: an outline history. Luton: White Crescent Press, 1978.

References 

1906 births
1999 deaths
English archivists
History of Bedfordshire
People from Bedfordshire
Women historians
English local historians